John Ordronaux may refer to:

 John Ordronaux (doctor) (1830–1908), American Civil War army surgeon and professor
 John Ordronaux (privateer) (1778–1841), privateer during the War of 1812